Glasul Basarabiei was a newspaper from Chişinău, Bessarabia, founded by Grigore Constantinescu in 1913.

References

Bibliography 
 Almanahul dicţionar al presei din România şi a celei româneşti de pretutindeni de G. Caliga. – București, 1926. – P. 155.

External links 
 PRESA BASARABEANĂ de la începuturi pînă în anul 1957. Catalog
 GRIGORE D. CONSTANTINESCU
 Grigore D. Constantinescu

Newspapers established in 1913
Publications disestablished in 1914
Romanian-language newspapers published in Moldova
Mass media in Chișinău
1913 establishments in the Russian Empire
1914 disestablishments in the Russian Empire